Tobias Andersson may refer to:
 Tobias Andersson (footballer), Swedish footballer
 Tobias Andersson (politician), Swedish politician

See also
 J. Tobias Anderson, Swedish artist and filmmaker